Shili is a village in Naurzum District, Kostanay Region, Kazakhstan. It is the administrative center of the Shili Rural District (KATO code - 395859100). Population:

Geography

References

Populated places in Kostanay Region